Victor Codron (24 December 1914 – 7 June 1997) was a French racing cyclist. He rode in the 1939 Tour de France.

References

External links
 

1914 births
1997 deaths
French male cyclists